Iijärvi is a common name of lakes in Finland. It may refer to
 Lake Iijärvi (Inari) in Inari, Finnish Lapland
 Lake Iijärvi (Kuusamo), North-eastern Finland
 Lake Iijärvi (Suomussalmi), North-eastern Finland
 Lake Iijärvi (Ristijärvi), Kainuu, Finland
 Lake Iijärvi (Sulkava), Finland